Joe Stracina (born July 18, 1930 in Montreal, Quebec, died August 13, 1996) was a Canadian Football League all star offensive lineman who played twelve seasons for three teams.

External links

1930 births
1996 deaths
Saskatchewan Roughriders players
Ottawa Rough Riders players
Montreal Alouettes players
Players of Canadian football from Quebec
Canadian football people from Montreal
Canadian football offensive linemen